Burgruine Wildon is a castle in Styria, Austria.

See also
List of castles in Austria

References
This article was initially translated from the German Wikipedia.

Castles in Styria